Amaranthus cannabinus is a plant species also known as salt marsh water hemp or salt marsh pigweed.  It is a herbaceous perennial found in most of the eastern United States.  It grows from 1 to 3 m in height.  It is often mistaken for Amaranthus australis.

References

cannabinus
Flora of the Eastern United States
Plants described in 1753
Taxa named by Carl Linnaeus